Diabolic is an American death metal band from Tampa Bay, Florida, United States, founded in 1996 by bassist/vocalist Paul Ouellette, drummer Aantar Lee Coates and guitarist Brian Malone.

Biography
The earliest beginnings of Diabolic started in 1996, when drummer Aantar Coates (Exmortis, Horror of Horrors, Unholy Ghost, Blastmasters)
teamed up with guitarist Kelly McLauchlin (Pessimist, Unholy Ghost, Possessed) to record the first 4-song Diabolic demo. Although this demo was never officially released, and sent only to select contacts in the underground, it marked the beginning of success to follow for the band.

By January 1997, Diabolic drummer/founder Aantar Coates had relocated to Tampa, Florida and after forming the first complete lineup, recorded and released the successful demo City of the Dead. This demo immediately got the band noticed in the worldwide underground press and was later released as MCD on Fadeless Records. By 1998, Diabolic made their debut live appearance opening for Vader in Tampa, Florida followed by Milwaukee Metalfest XII. The lineup was soon solidified to include Aantar Coates on drums, Paul Ouellette on lead guitar and vocals, Brian Malone on lead guitars, and Ed Webb on bass.

In 1999, Diabolic recorded their debut full-length album Supreme Evil. This CD, which was mastered at Morrisound Recording Studios in Tampa and featured the artwork of Joe Petagno (Motörhead, Marduk, Krisiun), was released on Conquest/Hammerheart Records and received a multitude of excellent reviews and established an enormous international underground following for the band. More live shows soon followed, and the band continued gaining notoriety and writing for their next release.

The following year in 2000, Diabolic recorded their second full-length album Subterraneal Magnitude, again released on Conquest/Hammerheart Records. Produced by Juan "Punchy" Gonzalez (Morbid Angel, Terrorizer), this album expanded the unique Diabolic sound to new extremes. By this time, vocalist Paul Ouellette had switched to bass, and the band had recruited Brian Hipp (Brutality, Cradle of Filth, Acheron) on lead guitars. It once again featured the art of Joe Petagno.

Diabolic was soon enlisted for the "Death Metal Massacre Tour 2000", opening for Cannibal Corpse, God Dethroned and Hate Eternal, playing to sold-out venues for four weeks, all across the USA. In 2001, Diabolic was honored to be chosen for the prestigious Metal Maniacs "Xmass Ball Tour 2001", opening for Enslaved and Macabre (which included a one-off with Lacuna Coil), followed by a 3-week North American Tour of the U.S. and Canada, supporting Marduk and Amon Amarth. Later that same year, Diabolic was hand-picked to open several dates across the southern U.S. with death metal pioneers Morbid Angel.

In 2002, Diabolic signed to Century Media/Olympic Records and surpassed all earlier releases with their third CD, Vengeance Ascending. Once again produced by Juan "Punchy" Gonzalez, this devastating attack redefined extreme metal in a relentless onslaught of anger, vengeance, and victory. Again this CD featured the art of Joe Petagno, and new lead guitarist recruit Jerry Mortellaro. The band then departed on a month-long, sold-out U.S. Tour supporting Dimmu Borgir, Cryptopsy, and Krisiun, further solidifying the band as one of the underground's most ferocious upcoming death metal acts. In November 2002 Diabolic made their European debut, for a month-long tour of 10 countries in support of Behemoth, Deströyer 666, and Deicide.

By 2003, and after the European Tour, the band had gone through several major lineup changes. Gone was the original lineup, who had all been replaced. Led by sole remaining original member Brian Malone, the band recorded their fourth full-length CD, Infinity Through Purification. Produced by Neil Kernon (Cannibal Corpse, Nile, Judas Priest) and released on Century Media Records, but without the trademark Diabolic of the past it garnered lackluster reviews. The band had even secured an opening slot on Deicide's upcoming U.S. Tour, but soon after the album's release, it was announced that the band was being dissolved permanently. It seemed that this would be the end of Diabolic.

Meanwhile, Diabolic original members Aantar Cotes (drums), Paul Ouellette (vocals, bass) along with guitarists Kelly McLauchlin (Pessimist, Unholy Ghost, Possessed) and Jerry Mortellaro (also formerly of Diabolic) had joined together in 2003 to form a new band, Unholy Ghost. The band signed to Century Media/Olympic Recs, and released the debut CD Torrential Reign, produced by Juan "Punchy" Gonzalez (Morbid Angel, Terrorizer) as well as recorded a video for "Under Existence", released on Century Media Europe DVD. The band went on to play several high profile fests such as "Sun 'n' Steel" Florida Metalfest, Snakenet.com "Metal Nation" Fest, Las Vegas Metalfest, and "Gathering of the Bestial Legions" Metalfest in Los Angeles. Despite its apparent success, Unholy Ghost soon disbanded in 2005 and lead guitarist Kelly McLauchlin went back to work with Pessimist, and drummer Aantar Coates went on to form yet another new band, Blastmasters.

By 2006, and amidst legal battles over the rights to use the name, Diabolic had re-formed. Original drummer Aantar Coates along with Unholy Ghost/Pessimist guitarist Kelly McLauchlin and parts of the Blastmasters lineup (RJ/guitars and Jesse Jolly/bass, Vox) recorded their comeback EP, Possessed By Death in 2007. Then after re-enlisting original bassist/vocalist Paul Ouellette in 2008, the band recorded yet another new EP, Chaos in Hell. Both self-produced EPs were recorded at DOW studios in Tampa, Florida again with long-time producer Juan "Punchy" Gonzalez. The band then signed to Deathgasm Records in 2008, and released both EPs on one CD, Chaos in Hell/Possessed by Death. Diabolic continued by playing select shows in Tampa with Monstrosity and Six Feet Under, and festivals including "Mayhem in May" in Louisville, Kentucky and "Gathering of the Bestial Legions III" Metalfest in Hollywood, California.

The band returned once again to DOW Studios and longtime producer Juan "Punchy" Gonzalez (Morbid Angel, Terrorizer, Unholy Ghost) and in 2010, Diabolic released the album, Excisions of Exorcisms on Deathgasm Records with a return to a core lineup that featured original drummer Aantar Coates (Unholy Ghost, Exmortis, Horror of Horrors, Blastmasters), original bassist/vocalist Paul Ouellette (Unholy Ghost), and lead guitarists Kelly McLauchlin (Unholy Ghost, Pessimist, Possessed) and Jeff Parrish (Blastmasters).

In April 2010, Diabolic was hand-selected to open the first several dates of the Cannibal Corpse "Evisceration Plague" Tour (in place of 1349), including shows in Atlanta GA, Raleigh NC, Washington DC and Long Island, NY. The band then made festival appearances at Las Vegas Deathfest II and Hostile City Death Fest II in Philadelphia, PA.

Jeff Parrish died on February 14, 2013, from a heart attack in his sleep. He was 40 years old.

Diabolic is currently writing new music for the next CD.

Lineup
Aantar Lee Coates - drums (1996–2002, 2004–present)
Kelly McLauchlin - guitars (1996-1997, 2006–2010, 2015-present)
Jerry Mortellaro - guitars (2001–2002, 2016–present)
Paul Ouellette - vocals, bass (1998–2002, 2007–2010, 2012–present), guitar (1997-1998, 2007)

Former members
Brian Malone - guitars (1997–2004)
Bryan Hipp - guitars (2000-2001)
Eric Hersemann - guitars (2002–2004)
Jeff Parrish  - guitars (2007–2013)
RJ Reinagle - guitars (2006–2007, 2011–2015)
Rutger A. Cole	 - bass (1996-1997)
Jesse Jolly - vocals, bass (2006)
John C. Hall III - vocals, bass (2011–2012)
Edwin Webb - bass (1997-1998, 1998-2000, 2003–2007), vocals (1998-2000, 2003-2008)
Tony Blakk - vocals, bass (2008-2009)
Gaël Barthelemy - drums (2003–2004)

Timeline

Discography
Supreme Evil (1998)
City of the Dead - EP (1999)
Subterraneal Magnitude (2001)
Vengeance Ascending (2001)
Infinity Through Purification (2003)
Shellfire and Tombstones (2006)
Possessed By Death EP (2007)
Chaos In Hell EP (2007)
Excisions of Exorcisms (2010)
Mausoleum of the Unholy Ghost (2020)

External links
Official Website
Official Facebook
Official MySpace

Death metal musical groups from Florida
Musical groups established in 1998